The Ukrainian five-hryvnia note (₴5) is one of the most common banknotes of the Ukrainian hryvnia.

The current five-hryvnia note is predominantly blue in colour. The front features a portrait of Ukrainian Hetman Bohdan Khmelnytsky. The reverse side shows a church in his birthplace village of Subotiv, where he is buried. An updated version of the note began circulation on 14 June 2004, with new security features.

The National Bank of Ukraine plans to introduce a new five-hryvnia coin, which will gradually replace the five-hryvnia note.

History

Ukrainian People's Republic

Modern Ukraine

1992

1995

References

Banknotes of Ukraine
Five-base-unit banknotes